The term Triad is used to designate certain historic groupings of seminal college fraternities in North America.

Union Triad
The Union Triad is a group of the three oldest existing Greek-letter social fraternities in North America that were founded at Union College in Schenectady, New York: the Kappa Alpha Society (established 1825), the Sigma Phi Society (1827) and the Delta Phi (1827). No formal organization exists.

Other fraternities which owe their birth to Union College include Psi Upsilon (1833), Chi Psi (1841) and Theta Delta Chi (1847). Collectively, these many foundings earned Union College the title Mother of Fraternities.

Miami Triad
The Miami Triad refers to three fraternities founded at Miami University in Oxford, Ohio, in the 19th century: Beta Theta Pi (1839), Phi Delta Theta (1848), and Sigma Chi (1855). Historians of fraternities often compare the significance of the Miami Triad to that of the earlier Union Triad.

Delta Zeta sorority was founded at Miami University in 1902, and Phi Kappa Tau fraternity in 1906. Delta Sigma Epsilon sorority began there in 1914, merging in 1956 with Delta Zeta. These numerous Greek organization foundings cause some to refer to the school also as the Mother of Fraternities.

It has been tradition at some campuses that have chapters of each of the Miami Triad, such as the University of Kansas, and the University of Mississippi, to hold an annual party, formal, or ball, often referred to as "Miami Triad" or simply "Triad", to commemorate their tie to each other and the Miami Triad's place in Greek history. This tradition has waned in recent years and some schools have transformed the celebration into new events, such as the University of Kansas' Miami Triad Concert.

Lexington Triad

The Lexington Triad is a group of three fraternities founded by students from colleges in Lexington, Virginia, during Reconstruction following the American Civil War.

Members of the triad include Alpha Tau Omega (founded in Richmond, Virginia, in 1865 by students from Virginia Military Institute (VMI) in Lexington), Kappa Alpha Order (founded in 1865 at Washington and Lee University and not to be confused with the Kappa Alpha Society), and Sigma Nu (founded in 1869 at VMI). The national headquarters of both the Kappa Alpha Order and Sigma Nu are located in Lexington.

The members of the Triad are sometimes also grouped as part of the Virginia Circle, which includes several other fraternities founded in Virginia roughly during the period of the Lexington Triad: Kappa Sigma and Pi Kappa Alpha at the University of Virginia, and sometimes Sigma Phi Epsilon at Richmond College.

Jefferson Duo and Pennsylvania Triad

The Jefferson Duo includes the fraternities Phi Gamma Delta and Phi Kappa Psi, founded in 1848 and 1852, respectively, at Jefferson College in Canonsburg, Pennsylvania.  A third, Kappa Phi Lambda, was also founded there but dissolved in 1874.  In 1865, Jefferson College combined with Washington College to become Washington & Jefferson College.

Phi Kappa Sigma, founded at the University of Pennsylvania in 1850, is grouped with Phi Gamma Delta and Phi Kappa Psi to complete the Pennsylvania Triad.

Farmville Four
Four sororities were formed at Longwood University, which are billed as the Farmville Four. These include Kappa Delta (1897), Sigma Sigma Sigma (1898), Zeta Tau Alpha (1898), and Alpha Sigma Alpha (1901). The four faces of the campus bell tower commemorate these four organizations.

See also
Mother of Fraternities
Syracuse Triad

References

Union College (New York)
Fraternities and sororities in the United States
Lexington, Virginia
Washington and Lee University
Virginia Military Institute
Miami University
3 (number)